Anatoly Volkov (born 23 December 1952) is a Russian boxer. He competed in the men's featherweight event at the 1976 Summer Olympics. At the 1976 Summer Olympics, he lost to Dave Armstrong of the United States.

References

External links
 

1952 births
Living people
Russian male boxers
Olympic boxers of the Soviet Union
Boxers at the 1976 Summer Olympics
Martial artists from Moscow
Featherweight boxers